Ryan Johnson (born 13 September 1974) is a Canadian freestyle skier. He was born in Mississauga, Ontario. He competed at the 2002 Winter Olympics in Salt Lake City, where he placed seventh in men's moguls.

References

External links

1974 births
Living people
Canadian male freestyle skiers
Freestyle skiers at the 1998 Winter Olympics
Freestyle skiers at the 2002 Winter Olympics
Olympic freestyle skiers of Canada
Sportspeople from Mississauga